Explication de Texte is a French formalist method of literary analysis that allows for limited reader response, similar to close reading in the English-speaking literary tradition.  The method involves a detailed yet relatively objective examination of structure, style, imagery, and other aspects of a work. It was particularly advocated by Gustave Lanson.

It is primarily a pedagogical tool, similar to a formal book report.

A simple format for writing an Explication de Texte is this:
 A brief summary of the literal, not the figurative, content;
 A description of the text's type and structure (e.g. Was it a sonnet? What kind?) and its tone;
 The poetic devices used in the text (e.g. personification)
 Conclusion

See also
 Book report
 Close reading
 Explication

References

Literary criticism